Oscar, OSCAR, or The Oscar may refer to:

People 

 Oscar (given name), an Irish- and English-language name also used in other languages; the article includes the names Oskar, Oskari, Oszkár, Óscar, and other forms.
 Oscar (Irish mythology), legendary figure, son of Oisín and grandson of Finn mac Cumhall

Places

United States
 Oscar, Kentucky, an unincorporated community
 Oscar, Louisiana, an unincorporated community
 Oscar, Missouri, an unincorporated community
 Oscar, Oklahoma, an unincorporated community
 Oscar, Pennsylvania, an unincorporated community
 Oscar, Texas, an unincorporated community
 Oscar, West Virginia, an unincorporated community
 Lake Oscar (disambiguation)
 Oscar Township, Otter Tail County, Minnesota, a civil township

Animals 

 Oscar (bionic cat), a cat that had implants after losing both hind paws
 Oscar (bull), #16, (d. 1983) a ProRodeo Hall of Fame bucking bull
 Oscar (fish), Astronotus ocellatus
 Oscar (therapy cat), cat purported to predict the deaths of hospice patients
 Oscar, a nickname for Beast of Busco, a North American cryptid turtle
 Oscar, a nickname for Unsinkable Sam, a World War II ship's cat

Arts, entertainment, and media 

 Oscars, another name for the Academy Awards, and the awarded statue, an Oscar

Characters 
 Oscar, a character in the video game Fire Emblem: Path of Radiance
 Oscar, the main character fish from the animated film Shark Tale
 Oscar, a main character fish from the animated television series Fish Hooks
 Oscar, an infant character in the film Ghostbusters II
 Oscar, a page in Verdi's opera Un ballo in maschera
 Oscar the Grouch, a Muppet on Sesame Street
 Old Oscar, a character in Jay Jay the Jet Plane
 Oscar Madison, the sloppy roommate in The Odd Couple media franchise
 Oscar Martinez (The Office), an openly gay accountant in the American TV series The Office

Films and manga 
 The Oscar (film), starring Stephen Boyd
 Oscar (1967 film), starring Louis de Funès
 Oscar (1991 film), starring Sylvester Stallone
 Lady Oscar or La Rose de Versailles, one of the best-known titles in shōjo manga and a media franchise created by Riyoko Ikeda
 Lady Oscar (film), a 1979 English-language Japanese-French romantic drama film based on La Rose de Versailles

Other arts, entertainment, and media 
 Oscar (opera), a 2013 opera about Oscar Wilde, by Theodore Morrison
 Oscar (video game), a 1993 platform game
 Oscar (TV serial), a 1985 British TV serial
 OSCAR Radio, a school FM radio station in Northamptonshire, England

Military 

 Oscar (paradummy), American nickname for decoys dropped during the 1944 invasion of Normandy
 Oscar, an Allies codename for Nakajima Ki-43, a World War II Japanese aircraft
 Oscar, the letter O in the ICAO spelling alphabet (NATO phonetic alphabet)
 Oscar-class submarine, a Soviet/Russian Navy submarine class

Organizations and enterprises 

 Office of the Scottish Charity Regulator (OSCR)
 Oscar Health, a U.S. health insurance company

Science 

 OSCAR (gene), short for Osteoclast-associated immunoglobulin-like receptor
 Ocean Surface Current Analysis – Real time, a website that provides data on ocean currents

Technology and transport 

 OSC OSCar, a synthesizer manufactured by the Oxford Synthesizer Company
 OScar, a project aiming to design an open source vehicle
 OScar (Danish automobile), a Danish sports car
 OSCAR (Orbital Satellite Carrying Amateur Radio), an artificial satellite built and used by amateur radio operators for use in the amateur-satellite service
 MSC Oscar, container ship
 Outer Suburban CAR, a name for NSW TrainLink H set, a type of electric train in Australia
 Oscar, a a whaling ship sunk off Aberdeen in 1813

Computing 
 OSCAR McMaster, an electronic medical record system
 OSCAR protocol, a protocol used by AOL Instant Messenger
 Open Source Cluster Application Resources, a Linux-based software installation

Other uses 

 Cyclone Oscar, a tropical cyclone
 Out of School Care and Recreation
 Veal Oscar, a culinary creation

See also 
 King Oscar (disambiguation)
 Oskar (disambiguation)